Velvary is a town in Kladno District in the Central Bohemian Region of the Czech Republic. It has about 3,000 inhabitants. The town centre is well preserved and is protected by law as an urban monument zone.

Administrative parts

Villages of Ješín, Malá Bučina and Velká Bučina are administrative parts of Velvary.

Geography
It lies on the Bakovský Stream in a flat agricultural landscape of the Lower Eger Table.

History
The first written mention of Velvary is from 1282. It was for centuries an important stop on the way from Prague to Saxony. After 1357, it became a royal property and it was raised to a market town by King Charles IV. In 1482 it became a town by King Vladislaus II.

Sport
The town is home to a football club TJ Slovan Velvary, which plays in the Bohemian Football League (third tier of the Czech football league system).

Sights
The major sights of the spacious Krále Vladislava Square include a Baroque Marian column (built in 1716–1719), a Baroque town hall from 1717, and the Gothic Church of Saint Catherine with murals from the 15th century. The Renaissance Prague Gate from 1580 is the last preserved of three town gates. There is also a valuable Renaissance Church of Saint George (built in 1613–1616) with a churchyard.

Notable people
Jan Antonín Koželuh (1738–1814), composer
Leopold Koželuh (1747–1818), composer
Václav Klement (1868–1938), automotive pioneer

Gallery

References

External links

 

Cities and towns in the Czech Republic
Populated places in Kladno District